WJYO (91.5 FM) is a radio station broadcasting a Christian radio format. Licensed to Fort Myers, Florida, United States, the station is owned by Airwaves For Jesus, Inc.

Notable syndicated programs regularly broadcast include:
Enjoying Everyday Life 
In Touch with Dr. Charles Stanley
Love Worth Finding
The Word For Today
Unshackled!
There are also programs for Christian music, and some original programming.

External links

Radio stations established in 1987
Mass media in Fort Myers, Florida
1987 establishments in Florida
JYO